Diacrita is a genus of picture-winged flies in the family Ulidiidae.

Species
 D. aemula
 D. costalis
 D. plana

References

Ulidiidae